Nathan Hunter Dingle (born July 23, 1971) is an American former professional football player who was a linebacker for three years in the National Football League (NFL). Dingle played for the Philadelphia Eagles, Jacksonville Jaguars and St. Louis Rams, appearing in a total of 17 games.

References

1971 births
American football linebackers
Washington Redskins players
Philadelphia Eagles players
Jacksonville Jaguars players
St. Louis Rams players
Living people
Cincinnati Bearcats football players